Changping (zhuang: Canghbingz Yangh) is a Township under the administration of Fusui County in southern Guangxi Zhuang Autonomous Region, China. , it had an area of  populated by 25,054 people residing in 1 residential communities and 8 villages.

Administrative divisions
There are 1 residential communities and 8 villages:

Residential communities:
 Changping (昌平社区)

Villages:
 Sairen (赛仁村), Mumin (木民村), Pingbai (平白村), Balian (八联村), Lianhao (联豪村), Sihe (四和村), Shili (石丽村), Zhonghua (中华村)

See also
List of township-level divisions of Guangxi

References

External links
 Changping Township/Official website of  Changping

Townships of Guangxi
Fusui County